Ezmol, stylized EzMol, is a web server for molecular modelling.

About
Ezmol is a molecular modeling web server for the visualisation of protein molecules. It has a limited selection of visualisation options for the most common requirements of molecular visualisation, enabling the rapid production of images through a wizard-style interface, without the use of command-line syntax. It is developed and maintained by Professor Michael Sternberg's group at The Centre for Integrative Systems Biology and Bioinformatics, Imperial College London and was published in the Journal of Molecular Biology in 2018.

References

External links 
 
 Official promotional video

Computational chemistry
Computational chemistry software
Molecular modelling software